Trials & Tribulations may refer to:

 Trials & Tribulations (Ace Hood album), 2013
 Trials & Tribulations (Bizzy Bone album), 2007
 Trials & Tribulations (Poetic Hustla'z album), 1997
Phoenix Wright: Ace Attorney: Trials and Tribulations, 2004